Year 119 (CXIX) was a common year starting on Saturday (link will display the full calendar) of the Julian calendar. At the time, it was known as the Year of the Consulship of Hadrianus and Rusticus (or, less frequently, year 872 Ab urbe condita). The denomination 119 for this year has been used since the early medieval period, when the Anno Domini calendar era became the prevalent method in Europe for naming years.

Events

By place

Roman Empire 
 Emperor Hadrian stations Legio VI Victrix in Roman Britain, to assist in quelling the resistance of a local rebellion. The legion is key in securing the victory, and eventually replaces Legio IX Hispana at Eboracum.
 Hadrian also visits Britain in this year at the request of governor of Britain Quintus Pompeius Falco.
 Salonia Matidia (a niece of former Emperor Trajan) dies. Hadrian delivers her funeral oration, and grants her a temple in Rome.

Asia 
 Reign in Northern India by Nahapana, Scythian king. He attacks the kingdom of Andhra and annexes Southern Rajputana.
</onlyinclude>

Births 
 Gaius Bruttius Praesens, Roman politician (approximate date)
 Marina of Aguas Santas, Roman Christian martyr (d. 139)

Deaths 
 December 23 – Salonia Matidia, niece of Trajan (b. AD 68)
 Plutarch, Greek historian and biographer (b. AD 46)
 San Secondo of Asti, Roman bishop and martyr
 Serapia, Roman slave and martyr (approximate date)

References